Iosif Bartha (18 July 1902 – 26 October 1957) was a Romanian footballer. He competed in the men's tournament at the 1924 Summer Olympics.

References

External links

1902 births
1957 deaths
Romanian footballers
Romania international footballers
Liga I players
Stăruința Oradea players
Crișana Oradea players
CA Oradea players
Olympic footballers of Romania
Footballers at the 1924 Summer Olympics
Sportspeople from Oradea
Association football defenders